This article describes the group stage of the 2014–15 EHF Champions League.

Format
24 teams were drawn into four groups of six teams, where they played each other twice. The top four teams advanced to the knockout stage. The draw took place on 27 June 2014, at 18:00 local time, in Vienna, Austria.

Seedings
The seedings were published on 23 June 2014.

Group A

Group B

Group C

Group D

References

External links
Official website

group stage
Sport in İzmit